The Japanese Association of Independent Television Stations (JAITS) is a group of Japan's reception fee-free commercial terrestrial television stations which are not members of the major national television networks. The association was established on November 4, 1977.

Its members sell to, buy from, and co-produce programs with other members. While a few of them, namely Tokyo MX, TVK and Sun TV and sell more than the others, it does not mean the former control the others in programming. Meanwhile, some JAITS members (GBS, MTV, BBC, TVN, WTV) broadcast a lot of TV Tokyo's programs. It forms a loose broadcast network without exclusivity. They form permanent and ad hoc subgroups for production and sales of advertising opportunity.

Name
The name of the group is provisional.  The Japanese documents for the association refer to the acronym JAITS but the fully spelled English name has not been disclosed yet.

The group's Japanese name has the term UHF because all of the member stations broadcast on the UHF band in analog, in contrast to major networks that primarily broadcast on the VHF band in analog.  All the Japanese terrestrial television stations switched to UHF digital when all analog television transmissions (both VHF and UHF) were shut down between July 24, 2011, and March 31, 2012.

Independent UHF stations

Characteristics of the independent stations

Degree of independence
In the strict (North American) definition of "not affiliated with any networks", the only independent terrestrial television station in Japan would be The Open University of Japan, which produces almost all its programs in-house. In addition, most of the JAITS independent stations have investments from the Chunichi Shimbun Co.

The JAITS and the Japanese public take  for not being members of large networks, in which the Tokyo's stations almost control other members' programming. Those networks are also affiliated with large national newspapers. On the other hands, the JAITS stations are often affiliated with prefectural or metropolitan newspapers and prefectural governments, whose degree of influence may vary.

MTV, GBS, BBC, TVN, and WTV broadcast a lot of TV Tokyo's programs.

Here is the description of characters of the independent commercial terrestrial television stations in Japan. Currently all such stations are members of the JAITS.

Market
Their areas of coverage are located in Kantō, Chūkyō and Kansai regions which are the most urbanised in Japan. Their reachable population is large. If the population was too small they could not have number of viewers and sponsorship to sustain the station. However their coverage are within major network stations' official coverage, except TXN network members TV Osaka's, TV Aichi's and TV Setouchi's which are adjacent to. Multi-channel cable television may cover significant parts of the areas. Externally sourced popular contents are often too expensive to buy therefore they are very difficult to beat major networks in viewing rates.

Programming
Compared with the major networks, the independent stations have a relatively smaller audience, but have a more flexible schedule due to their decentralized nature.

Short-running anime productions (as little as one episode) are often broadcast by the independent stations, a concept which has been referred to as "UHF anime". They also sometimes run shopping programming, along with brokered programming such as infomercials and televangelism. In 2000, All Japan Pro Wrestling moved to JAITS affiliates after it ended its run on Nippon TV.

See also
 Independent station (North America)
 TV Azteca 
 Grupo Imagen
 Grupo Multimedios
 Independent station (other parts of the world)

Notes

References

JAITS

Television channels and stations established in 1977